Atelestus is a genus of flies belonging to the family Atelestidae.

The species of this genus are found in Europe.

Species:
 Atelestus dissonans Collin, 1961 
 Atelestus pulicarius (Fallen, 1816)

References

Empidoidea
Empidoidea genera